Clea Lewis (born July 19, 1965) is an American actress, best known for her television role as Ellen's annoying  friend, Audrey Penney in Ellen DeGeneres' sitcom Ellen.

Personal life 
Lewis was born in Cleveland Heights, Ohio, to a writer mother and a former vaudeville performer and lawyer father. Lewis graduated from Brown University in 1987. She has two sons with her husband, playwright and children's book author Peter Ackermann: Stanley, born in 2002, and Alvin, born in 2005.

Career 
Lewis appeared on The Fresh Prince of Bel-Air and Flying Blind. She also appeared in the pilot episode of Friends, in which she played Frannie. She has appeared in numerous films, including Scotch & Milk, The Rich Man's Wife, and Diabolique. In 2000, she performed the voice of Amy Lawrence in Tom Sawyer. Lewis played Gina, a chatty ad agency worker, in 2007's Perfect Stranger. She also voiced various characters in the Nickelodeon cartoon SpongeBob SquarePants.

She also appeared on the short-lived Andy Barker, P.I. as Jenny Barker, the wife of the title character.

Her somewhat nasal, squeaky voice has meant a great deal of animation voice-over work for Lewis, including in both television (ABC's Saturday morning cartoon, Pepper Ann) as Nicky Little and film (Ice Age: The Meltdown). She also recorded the book-on-CD for books 4-10 of The Princess Diaries book series.

Filmography

Film

Television

Theatre

References

External links 
 

1965 births
Living people
Actresses from Cleveland
American musical theatre actresses
American television actresses
American voice actresses
Brown University alumni
People from Cleveland Heights, Ohio
20th-century American actresses
21st-century American actresses